Mafosfamide (INN) is an oxazaphosphorine (cyclophosphamide-like) alkylating agent under investigation as a chemotherapeutic.  It is metabolized by cytochrome P450 into 4-hydroxycyclophosphamide, which is then converted into aldophosphamide, which, in turn yields the cytotoxic metabolites phosphoramide mustard and acrolein.

Several Phase I trials have been completed.

References

Experimental cancer drugs
Oxazaphosphinans
Phosphorodiamidates
Nitrogen mustards
Organochlorides
Thioethers
Sulfonic acids
Chloroethyl compounds